The 2019–20 season was Al-Nassr's 44th consecutive season in the top flight of Saudi football and 64th year in existence as a football club. Al-Nassr enter the season as the Saudi Pro League title holders. Along with the Pro League, the club competed in the King Cup and both the 2019 and the 2020 editions of the AFC Champions League.

The season covered the period from 1 July 2019 to 3 October 2020.

Players

Squad information

Out on loan

Transfers and loans

Transfers in

Transfers out

Loans out

Pre-season

Competitions

Overall

Overview

Goalscorers

Last Updated: 3 October 2020

Clean sheets

Last Updated: 3 October 2020

References

Al Nassr FC seasons
Nassr